Arlington Cecil Jones (February 17, 1870 – July 15, 1923) was an American college football player, coach, and doctor. Jones played as a prominent halfback for the Virginia Cavaliers. He served as the head football coach at Virginia Tech—then known Virginia Agricultural and Mechanical College (VAMC) and renamed as Virginia Agricultural and Mechanical College and Polytechnic Institute (VPI)—from 1895 to 1896 and at Ohio University in 1901, compiling a career college football record of 15–4–2.

Head coaching record

References

External links
 

1870 births
1923 deaths
19th-century players of American football
American football halfbacks
Ohio Bobcats football coaches
Virginia Cavaliers football coaches
Virginia Cavaliers football players
Virginia Tech Hokies football coaches
All-Southern college football players
People from Pulaski County, Virginia
Players of American football from Virginia